The 2015 BFD Energy Challenger was a professional tennis tournament played on clay courts. 

It was the first edition of the tournament, which was part of the 2015 ATP Challenger Tour. 

It took place in Rome, Italy between 28 September and 4 October 2015.

Seeds

Draw

References
Main Draw

BFD Energy Challenger - Doubles